Archips elongatus is a species of moth of the family Tortricidae. It is found in Shaanxi, China.

The length of the forewings is about 8 mm. The forewings are yellowish brown with a reddish-brown pattern. The hindwings are greyish brown.

References

Moths described in 1987
Archips
Moths of Asia